This is a list of the Spanish Singles number-ones of 1973.

Chart history

See also
1973 in music
List of number-one hits (Spain)

References

1973
Spain Singles
Number-one singles